CHHS is a four-letter acronym, and may refer to:

Schools

Australia
Camden Haven High School, 	Laurieton, New South Wales
Castle Hill High School, Castle Hill, New South Wales
Chester Hill High School, Chester Hill, New South Wales
Coffs Harbour High School, Coffs Harbour, New South Wales

Canada
Crescent Heights High School (Calgary, Alberta)
Crescent Heights High School (Medicine Hat), Alberta

Cayman Islands
Clifton Hunter High School

Turks and Caicos (UK)
Clement Howell High School, Providenciales

United Kingdom
Cheadle Hulme High School, Cheadle Hulme, Stockport, England

United States
Calaveras Hills High School, Milpitas, California
Cape Henlopen High School, Lewes, Delaware
Chancellor High School, Fredericksburg, Virginia
Chapel Hill High School (Chapel Hill, North Carolina)
Charles Henderson High School, Charles Henderson, Alabama
Chino Hills High School, Chino Hills, California
City Honors High School, Inglewood, California
Cleveland Heights High School, Cleveland Heights, Ohio
Clover Hill High School, Midlothian, Virginia
Colleyville Heritage High School, Colleyville, Texas
Collins Hill High School, Suwanee, Georgia
Colonial Heights High School, Colonial Heights, Virginia
Columbia Heights High School, Minnesota
Copper Hills High School, West Jordan, Utah
Croton-Harmon High School, Croton-on-Hudson, New York
Chartiers Houston High School, Houston, Pennsylvania

Other
California Health and Human Services Agency
Center for Health and Homeland Security
College of Health and Human Sciences at California State University, Stanislaus